Results from Norwegian football (soccer) in the year 1913.

Class A of local association leagues
Class A of local association leagues (kretsserier) is the predecessor of a national league competition. The champions qualify for the 1913 Norwegian Cup.

Norwegian Cup

First round

|colspan="3" style="background-color:#97DEFF"|14 September 1913

The rest of the teams had a walkover.

Second round

|colspan="3" style="background-color:#97DEFF"|21 September 1913

Ørn had a walkover.
Kvik (Fredrikshald) had a walkover.

Semi-finals

|colspan="3" style="background-color:#97DEFF"|29 September 1913

Final

National team

Sources:

References

External links
RSSSF Football Archive

 
Seasons in Norwegian football